Good trip may refer to:

 A parting phrase
 A highly pleasant psychedelic experience